Oleksandr Derebchynskyi is a Soviet and Ukrainian football player.

Career
Oleksandr Derebchynskyi started his career in 2012 with Krymteplytsia Molodizhne for one season where he played 7 matches. In summer 2013 he moved to Bukovyna Chernivtsi for one season where he played 13 matches. Then he moved to Desna Chernihiv the main club of Chernihiv, here he stayed two season where he manage to play 32 matches and scored 6 goals. In summer 2015 he moved to Zirka Kropyvnytskyi where he played 15 matches and scored 1 goal against Ternopil. 2017 he moved to Kolkheti-1913 Poti a football club in Georgia, here he played 14 matches and scoring 6 goals. In 2018 he returned to Ukraine in the side of Obolon Kyiv, where he played 18 matches and scoring 1 goal. In 2021 he played 1 match with SC Chaika in Ukrainian Second League.

Honours
Zirka Kropyvnytskyi
 Ukrainian First League 2015–16

Desna Chernihiv
 Ukrainian Second League 2012–13

References

External links 
 
 Олександр Деребчинський allplayers.in.ua

1991 births
Living people
Soviet footballers
Footballers from Odesa
Ukrainian footballers
FC Desna Chernihiv players
FC Zirka Kropyvnytskyi players
FC Bukovyna Chernivtsi players
SC Chaika Petropavlivska Borshchahivka players
FC Kolkheti-1913 Poti players
FC Obolon-Brovar Kyiv players
Ukrainian Premier League players
Association football forwards